Stan Moore is a retired American ice hockey player and coach.

Early life and education 
Moore was born in Massena, New York. He graduated from the State University of New York at Oswego in 1978.

Career 
After graduating from college, Moore embarked on a coaching career, taking him to several programs throughout the Northeast. While he spent the majority of his career as an assistant coach, Moore worked as the head coach of Union for two seasons, and then as an interim coach for both Colgate and Colby, each for only one season. Despite the short time he spent as a head coach, Moore has received the ECAC Hockey Coach of the Year Award twice and won a conference regular season title.

For the 2018–2019 season, Moore coached the Italian Hockey League second tier team of Caldaro, which he led to both league and Coppa Italia wins.

Head coaching record

References

External links
 / 
Stan Moore's career statistics at Elite Prospects

Year of birth missing (living people)
Living people
Colby Mules men's ice hockey coaches
Colgate Raiders men's ice hockey coaches
Providence Friars men's ice hockey coaches
Union Dutchmen ice hockey coaches
Ice hockey coaches from New York (state)
People from Massena, New York
Ice hockey players from New York (state)